Sophie McShera (born 17 May 1985) is an English actress known for her roles as Ros McCain in the fifth series of the BBC television series Waterloo Road, as Daisy Mason in the ITV television series Downton Abbey, and as Drizella Tremaine in the 2015 Disney film Cinderella.

Early life, education, and personal life
McShera was born in Bradford, West Yorkshire, England, into a large Irish family. Her mother is a teacher and her father is a teacher turned financial adviser. At an early age, her family moved to nearby Eccleshill, West Yorkshire, also in Bradford, where she attended St Joseph's College.

After high school, she attended the Footsteps Theatre School before getting her stage break at the age of twelve in the comedy The Goodbye Girl. She followed this up with a stint on tour with Annie before completing her GCSEs and A-levels and going to Brunel University, London, where she earned a degree in drama.

McShera told Rachel Ray In Season magazine in 2019 that she was a vegetarian.

Career
McShera's acting career started after university in 2007, with roles in the soap operas Emmerdale and Doctors and the drama Survivors in 2008. In 2009, she joined the regular cast of BBC One school-based drama series Waterloo Road, playing A-level student Ros McCain for the entirety of the fifth series. Ros' storylines revolved around her trying to fulfil her academic potential and also questioning her sexuality. Following her departure from Waterloo Road, McShera became part of the cast of Julian Fellowes' ITV costume drama Downton Abbey as Daisy, the kitchen maid. The show attracted critical and popular success. McShera, alongside Hugh Bonneville, made a personal thank you to the audience after Downton Abbey won Most Popular TV Drama at the 2012 National TV Awards. Since 2013 McShera has played Job Centre regular Bryony in ITV2 sitcom The Job Lot. McShera played stepsister Drisella Tremaine in Disney's 2015 film Cinderella. She displayed her singing skills as lady's maid Gwynne in the ABC musical comedy series Galavant.

Her stage roles include playing the eponymous role in the pantomime Cinderella at the West Yorkshire Playhouse between December 2009 and January 2010, In 1998 she appeared as Annie alongside Paul O'Grady for the show's London run and subsequent tour. In 2011 she joined the cast of Jez Butterworth's award-winning stage play Jerusalem playing the role of Pea for the play's return to London's West End at the Apollo Theatre.

Filmography

Film

Television

References

External links
 

1985 births
Actresses from Bradford
Alumni of Brunel University London
English musical theatre actresses
British people of Irish descent
Living people
People educated at St. Joseph's Catholic College, Bradford
People from Eccleshill, West Yorkshire
21st-century English actresses